Mullah Mohammed Isa Akhund is the current Deputy Minister of Minerals and Petroleum of the Islamic Emirate of Afghanistan since 23 November 2021. He has also served as Minister of Minerals and Petroleum of the Islamic Emirate of Afghanistan from 7 September 2021 to 22 November 2021 replaced by Shahabuddin Delawar He also served as minister of mines and industries in the previous government (1996–2001).

References

Living people
Taliban government ministers of Afghanistan
Year of birth missing (living people)